The 2015 FIA Alternative Energies Cup is the ninth season of the FIA Alternative Energies Cup, a world championship for vehicles with alternative energy propulsion organized by the Fédération Internationale de l'Automobile.

For the final classifications of the Cup the sum of up to three best results for each Category or amalgamated Category of vehicles will be taken into account.

Calendar and winners

Championship standings

Drivers' championships Cat. VII-VIII

Co-Drivers' championships Cat. VII-VIII

References

FIA E-Rally Regularity Cup seasons
Alternative Energies Cup